Marysville Joint Unified School District (MJUSD) is a school district in California, United States, headquartered in Marysville. It serves areas of Yuba County, including Marysville, Linda, Olivehurst, Challenge-Brownsville, Dobbins, Loma Rica, and a part of Plumas Lake.

History
In 2003 Marysville JUSD gave territory to Plumas Elementary School District and Wheatland Union High School District.

Schools
7-12 schools
 Marysville Charter Academy for the Arts

High schools
 Lindhurst High School
 Marysville High School

Intermediate
 Foothill Intermediate School
 McKenny Intermediate School
 Yuba Gardens Intermediate School

Elementary
 Arboga
 Browns Vally
 Cedar Lane
 Cordua
 Covillaud
 Dobbins
 Edgewater
 Ella
 Johnson Park
 Kynoch
 Linda
 Loma Rica
 Olivehurst
 Yuba Feather

References

External links

 

School districts in California
Education in Yuba County, California
Marysville, California